

Champions by Year
Below is a list of Big Ten Conference men's basketball regular season champions. There are no tie breakers within the Big Ten Conference. Thus, if two or more teams tie atop the standing at the end of the season, they both win a shared championship.

Source

Championships by school
Source

^ Due to an academic scandal, Minnesota vacated its 1997 Big Ten Conference regular season title.

† Due to NCAA sanctions, Ohio State vacated its shares of the 2000 and 2002 Big Ten Conference regular season titles.

Italics indicates a team no longer competing in the Big Ten.

Bold indicates an outright Big Ten Championship.

Championships by head coach

*Active Big Ten coach

†Ralph Jones won 2 championships each with Purdue and Illinois

See also
 Big Ten Conference women's basketball regular season champions

References

Champions